455 may refer to:

 Cubana Flight 455
 The year 455
 British Rail Class 455, a British EMU train
 Ginza stop, station code